Princess Rallou Karatza (1799, Constantinople – 1870, Thonberg near Leipzig) was a Phanariote Greek artist. She was the daughter of the Prince of Wallachia, Ioannis Karatzas (r. 1812–1818). She convinced her father to found a Royal Dramatic Society, and founded the first court theatre. She became an actress, theatre director, translator and participant in the Greek War of Independence.

She had an early interest for theatre, both ancient and modern. She became the founder of the first theatre in Bucharest called "Cişmeaua Roşie", formed by students from the Greek School in Bucharest. She became a member of the secret group Filiki Eteria, which worked for the independence of Greece from the Ottoman Empire, and became a great weapon in the propaganda for Greek independence through the plays she performed on stage. She translated and directed plays from Western Europe and gave scholarships for actors to study in Paris. She moved to Athens in 1829. Married to George Argyropoulos, she died on 16 April 1870 in Thonberg near Leipzig.

References
 Marcu, George (ed.), Dicţionarul personalităţilor feminine din România, Editura Meronia, București, 2009.
 Jennifer S. Uglow, The Macmillan Dictionary of Women's Biography, 1982.

External links
 George Marcu, DOAMNE ŞI DOMNIŢE ALE ROMÂNILOR: IV. DOMNIŢA RALLOU CARAGEA at reteaualiterara.ning.com

1799 births
1870 deaths
19th-century Greek actresses
19th-century translators
19th-century Greek women writers
19th-century Greek writers
Rallou
Greek stage actresses
Greek theatre directors
Greek translators
Greek princesses
Women in the Greek War of Independence
Wallachian people of the Greek War of Independence
Members of the Filiki Eteria
19th-century Romanian actresses
Phanariotes